Kingsessing is a neighborhood in the Southwest section of Philadelphia, Pennsylvania, United States. On the west side of the Schuylkill River, it is next to the neighborhoods of Cedar Park, Southwest Schuylkill, and Mount Moriah, as well as the borough of Yeadon in Delaware County. It is roughly bounded by 53rd Street to the northeast, Baltimore Avenue to the northwest, Cobbs Creek and 60th Street to the southwest, and Woodland Avenue to the southeast.

History

The name Kingsessing, also spelled Chinsessing, comes from a Delaware word meaning  "a place where there is a meadow". The historic Lenape, or Delaware as the English called them, had a village of the same name that roughly occupied the same site as where the current neighborhood was later developed. When the township was organized to encompass where the Lenape and a later Swedish village stood, it also was named as Kingsessing.

Bartram's Garden, started by colonial botanist John Bartram in the late 1700s, is still operated in this neighborhood. It had an international reputation and is considered the first true botanical garden in the United States. It has been designated as a National Historic Landmark.

The S. Weir Mitchell School was added to the National Register of Historic Places in 1986.

Infrastructure and government
 The United States Postal Service operates the Kingsessing Post Office at 5311 Florence Avenue.
 Grays Ferry Bridge
 49th Street station (SEPTA Regional Rail)

Education

Public libraries
Free Library of Philadelphia operates the Kingsessing Branch at 1201 South 51st Street, below Chester Avenue.

See also
New Sweden
Newkirk Viaduct Monument

References

Sources
Chronology of the Political Subdivisions of the County of Philadelphia, 1683–1854
Information courtesy of ushistory.org
Incorporated District, Boroughs, and Townships in the County of Philadelphia, 1854 By Rudolph J. Walther - excerpted from the book at the ushistory.org website
 'Row House Days' courtesy of ushistory.org

Neighborhoods in Philadelphia
Southwest Philadelphia